"Bad to the Bone" is the third single from American hip hop duo Kool G Rap & DJ Polo's 1990 album Wanted: Dead or Alive. It was later also featured on the compilation albums The Best of Cold Chillin' (2000), Greatest Hits (2002) and Street Stories: The Best of Kool G Rap & DJ Polo (2013).

Samples
"Bad to the Bone" samples the following songs:
"Do the Funky Penguin" by Rufus Thomas

And was later sampled on:
"The Finest Man" by Percy Filth featuring Chris Read

Track listing

12"
A-side
 "Bad to the Bone" (Street Remix) (4:31)

B-side
 "Bad to the Bone" (Radio Remix) (3:56)
 "Bad to the Bone" (Dub) (4:31)

Cassette
A-side
 "Bad to the Bone" (Street Remix) (4:31)

B-side
 "Bad to the Bone" (Radio Remix) (3:56)
 "Bad to the Bone" (Dub) (4:31)

CD
 "Bad to the Bone" (Radio Remix) (3:56)
 "Bad to the Bone" (Street Remix) (4:31)
 "Bad to the Bone" (Dub) (4:31)

References

External links
 "Bad to the Bone" at Discogs

1991 singles
Kool G Rap songs
Songs written by Kool G Rap
Song recordings produced by Large Professor
1990 songs
Cold Chillin' Records singles
Warner Records singles